Cube Zero is a 2004 Canadian science fiction psychological horror film written and directed by Ernie Barbarash, in his directorial debut. It is the third installment in the Cube series and a prequel to the first film.

The first two films take place almost entirely within the Cube maze, and Cube Zero is set in both its interior and exterior. It reverts to the industrial-designed, colored rooms of the first Cube, but with a refreshed and redesigned set.

Plot 
Ryjkin is a man trying to escape from the Cube. Upon entering a trapped room, he is sprayed with a mysterious liquid that he fears is acid only to find it sweet tasting, thinking it is flavored water, desperately drinking it to quench his thirst. However he discovers to his horror it is a potent molecular base that melts his entire body after a few minutes, killing him.

The rooms in the Cube are being monitored from a remote observation room by two technicians, Eric Wynn and Dodd, who are unaware of who their employers are. The pair regularly play chess during work, whereupon Wynn demonstrates mental calculator abilities which he uses to predict Dodd's moves.

Wynn and Dodd are ordered to record the dream of a subject, Cassandra Rains. In her dream, Wynn sees Rains captured while walking in a forest with her daughter. Rains wakes up in the Cube and meets the other occupants: Robert Haskell, Jellico, Meyerhold and Bartok. Haskell has the same tattoo on his forehead as the soldier who captured Rains. However, Haskell, like everyone else, only knows his own name and has no recollection of his former life or how he got there. According to what Wynn and Dodd know, everyone in the Cube faced a death sentence and volunteered to partake in psychological experiments instead. Rains's consent form, however, is not found in her file. The captives venture through the Cube, testing each room for traps by throwing a boot in first. Bartok, Jellico, and Meyerhold are all killed by various traps, leaving Rains and Haskell as the sole survivors.

A phone call from their superiors instructs Wynn and Dodd to perform an "exit procedure" for Owen, a former colleague of theirs and now a test subject, who has reached one of the exits of the Cube. The procedure fails after Owen answers no to a question - whether or not he believes in God - prompting Dodd to push a "no" button which causes Owen to be instantly incinerated. According to Dodd, no one has ever answered positively. Wynn concludes that the Cube is inhumane and people are being placed in it against their will, therefore decides to enter the Cube himself and rescue Rains: he enters an elevator that communicates with a Cube entrance and eventually joins Rains and Haskell.

Dodd is joined in the observation room by his supervisor Jax and two of his analysts, who have learned of the incident. Jax has the Cube occupants trapped in one room, then electrifies the walls to electrocute them. Dodd relents and secretly sabotages the control panels servicing the Cube. This shuts down every trap and initiates a "reset mode", which gives the prisoners ten minutes to escape the Cube as its rooms return to their initial positions, before a sterilization procedure vaporizes everything inside. Jax discovers Dodd's betrayal and kills him, then he activates Haskell's sleeper agent through a chip implanted in him. Haskell becomes hostile towards his companions, who struggle to continue their escape and leave him behind. They reach an exit to find Haskell waiting for them. In the ensuing struggle, Wynn and Rains manage to jump into the auxiliary exit right as the sterilization procedure starts, vaporizing Haskell.

Wynn and Rains swim through water and emerge in a lake. They run through a forest similar to the one seen in Rains's dream, while being chased by soldiers. Wynn is tranquilized and recaptured, allowing Rains to escape. He wakes up in a surgery room, where Jax informs him that he has been sentenced for high treason, and that many years earlier he had agreed to become a test subject, despite Wynn remembering neither the trial nor signing the consent. Wynn's brain is surgically altered, and he dreams about Rains reuniting with her daughter and praising him as a superhero. Wynn is now mentally disabled, put back in the Cube, and found by its new captives. He repeatedly mentions the color of the room and that he wants to go back to a different color, similar to Kazan in the first Cube film.

Cast 
 Zachary Bennett as Eric Wynn, a junior Cube technician. A child prodigy and a genius, he is the newest recruit for the Cube.
 David Huband as Dodd, a senior Cube technician, who is at odds with Wynn for his constant questioning personality.
 Stephanie Moore as Cassandra Rains, a political demonstrator trapped in the Cube.
 Michael Riley as Jax, senior supervisor of the Cube, fitted with an artificial eye.
 Martin Roach as Robert P. Haskell, an ex Cube soldier trapped in the Cube.
 Mike "Nug" Nahrgang as Meyerhold, a man trapped in the Cube.
 Terri Hawkes as Jellico, a woman trapped in the Cube.
 Richard McMillan as Bartok, a man trapped in the Cube.
 Tony Munch as Owen, a senior cube technician placed in the Cube.
 Jasmin Geljo as Ryjkin, a man trapped in the Cube.
 Joshua Peace as Finn
 Diego Klattenhoff as Quigley

Release 
The film premiered at the Screamfest Horror Film Festival on 15 October 2004. It was released on DVD in the United States on 22 February 2005.

Reception 

Reviews have been mostly positive, including positive notices from JoBlo.com, AMC's Movie Guide, DVD Talk, and Bloody Disgusting, with Bloody Disgusting saying that "Cube Zero isn't the best of the series, but it comes close".

Accolades
The film won the award for "Best Special Effects" at the 2004 Screamfest Horror Film Festival.

References

External links 

 
 
 

2004 horror films
2004 films
2004 independent films
2000s psychological horror films
Canadian science fiction films
English-language Canadian films
2000s science fiction horror films
Cube (film series)
Films about mathematics
Films directed by Ernie Barbarash
2004 directorial debut films
2000s Canadian films
Canadian prequel films
2000s Japanese films